"Hey Hey Hey (Pop Another Bottle)" is a song by Belgian DJ Laurent Wéry, featuring vocals from Dev & Swift K.I.D. The song was written by K. Snelle, Laurent Wery, A.K. Jermaine, Devin Tailes and produced my Serge Ramaekers. It was released in Belgium as a digital download on 26 September 2011.

Music video
A music video to accompany the release of "Hey Hey Hey (Pop Another Bottle)" was first released onto YouTube on 18 August 2011 at a total length of three minutes and five seconds. It features Swift K.I.D. and Dev, at a house party. Lyrics also appear in the video in the same style seen on the cover art work. The video has had almost 10 million views on YouTube as of April 2020.

Track listing
Digital download
 "Hey Hey Hey" (video edit) [feat. Swift K.I.D. & Dev] – 3:05
 "Hey Hey Hey" (extended video edit) [feat. Swift K.I.D. & Dev] – 5:29
 "Hey Hey Hey" (DJ Licious Dev-ine Remix) [feat. Swift K.I.D. & Dev] – 5:02
 "Hey Hey Hey" (Natural Born Grooves Remix) [feat. Swift K.I.D. & Dev] – 6:27

Credits and personnel
Lead vocals – Swift K.I.D. and Dev
Producers – Serge Ramaekers
Lyrics – K. Snelle, Laurent Wery, A.K. Jermaine, Devin Tailes
Label: 541 / N.E.W.S.

Charts

Weekly charts

Year-end charts

Certifications

Release history

References

2011 singles
2011 songs
Dev (singer) songs
Laurent Wéry songs
Songs written by Dev (singer)
Songs written by Laurent Wéry